The CBSA World Chinese Eight-ball Championship, also known as the  Chinese Pool World Championship, is a pool tournament in the discipline of Chinese eight-ball. The event has been held annually since 2015, taking place in Yushan, Jiangxi in China. The tournament is one of the highest-paid pool tournaments in the world, with 2015 winner Darren Appleton winning $98,000.

Results 
Below is a list of results from the tournament starting from its inception in 2015.

Men

Women

References

External links 

Sport in Jiangxi
Pool competitions